The 1955 NCAA Men's Ice Hockey Tournament was the culmination of the 1954–55 NCAA men's ice hockey season, the 8th such tournament in NCAA history. It was held between March 10 and 12, 1955, and concluded with Michigan defeating Colorado College 5–3. All games were played at the Broadmoor Ice Palace in Colorado Springs, Colorado.

Qualifying teams
Four teams qualified for the tournament, two each from the eastern and western regions. The two best WIHL teams and a Tri-State League representative received bids into the tournament as did one independent school.

Format
The eastern team judged as better was seeded as the top eastern team while the WIHL champion was given the top western seed. The second eastern seed was slotted to play the top western seed and vice versa. All games were played at the Broadmoor Ice Palace. All matches were Single-game eliminations with the semifinal winners advancing to the national championship game and the losers playing in a consolation game.

Bracket

Note: * denotes overtime period(s)

Semifinals

Harvard vs. Michigan

Colorado College vs. St. Lawrence

Consolation Game

Harvard vs. St. Lawrence

National Championship

Colorado College vs. Michigan

All-Tournament Team

First Team
G: Lorne Howes (Michigan)
D: Phil Hilton* (Colorado College)
D: Doug Silverberg (Colorado College)
F: Bill Cleary (Harvard)
F: Bill MacFarland (Michigan)
F: Tom Rendall (Michigan)
* Most Outstanding Player(s)

Second Team
G: Bill Sloan (St. Lawrence)
D: Bob Schiller (Michigan)
D: Mike Buchanan (Michigan)
F: Clare Smith (Colorado College)
F: Ken Smith (Colorado College)
F: Dick Dunnigan (Michigan)

References

Tournament
NCAA Division I men's ice hockey tournament
NCAA Men's Ice Hockey Tournament
NCAA Men's Ice Hockey Tournament
1950s in Colorado Springs, Colorado
Ice hockey competitions in Colorado Springs, Colorado